Glaniopsis is a small genus of loaches endemic to the island of Borneo.

Species
There are currently four recognized species in this genus:
 Glaniopsis denudata T. R. Roberts, 1982
 Glaniopsis gossei T. R. Roberts, 1982
 Glaniopsis hanitschi Boulenger, 1899
 Glaniopsis multiradiata T. R. Roberts, 1982

References

Gastromyzontidae
Fish of Asia